Carman is a surname. Notable people with the surname include:

Anja Čarman (born 1985), Slovenian swimmer
Bliss Carman (1861–1929), Canadian poet
Brynn Carman (born 1994), American pair skater
Don Carman (born 1959), American baseball player
Ezra A. Carman (1834–1909), United States Army officer
George Carman (1929–2001), English barrister
Gregory W. Carman (1937–2020), United States Representative from New York
Harry Carman (fl. 1940s), American historian
James Carman (1876–?), English footballer
Jon Carman (born 1976), American football player
Nancy Carman (born 1950), American ceramist
Patrick Carman (born 1966), American novelist
Phil Carman (born 1950), Australian rules footballer
Syd Carman (1901–?), Australian rules footballer
Taylor Carman (born 1965), American philosopher

See also
Carmen (surname)
Carmon, surname
Carmin (disambiguation), includes list of people with name Carmin